The National Security Education Program (NSEP) was a U.S. federal government initiative to enhance the national security of the U.S. by increasing the national capacity to understand and interact effectively with foreign cultures and languages. NSEP oversaw nine critical initiatives designed to attract, recruit, and train a future national security workforce. Some funding came in exchange for a commitment to U.S. federal government service upon completion of academic study. NSEP was aimed at building a wider pool of Americans with foreign language and international skills by involving participants in "innovative, intensive, and long-term programs designed to provide meaningful opportunities to gain significant competencies in these languages and cultures."

NSEP was established by the National Security Education Act in 1991. Oversight for NSEP was provided by the National Security Education Board (NSEB), which met "to review and make recommendations based on program mission and objectives." The NSEB consists of a 13-member board including representatives from seven Cabinet-level departments.  Six non-federal members, appointed by the President also serve on the NSEB. The Office of the Under Secretary of Defense for Personnel and Readiness (OSD/P&R) provided policy oversight for NSEP.

On February 6, 2012, the National Security Education Program and Defense Language Office were merged to form the Defense Language and National Security Education Office, which consolidates cultural, linguistic, and regional foreign studies education efforts into a single program capable of satisfying national and Department-wide requirements.

Initiatives
NSEP had nine initiatives (at least some of which were transferred to DLNSEO):

See also
National Security Language Initiative
Defense Language Office

References

External links
 Official website
 Boren Awards
 The Language Flagship
 American Councils for International Education
 National Language Service Corps (NLSC)
 English for Heritage Language Speakers (EHLS)

United States national security policy
Scholarships in the United States
Learning programs